Cream Anthems 97 is a mix album, Disc 1 by Paul Oakenfold and Disc 2 by Nick Warren.

Disc 1
 "Mystery Land"
 "Plastic Dreams" [Dave Morales Club Mix]
 "Remember" [Album Version]
 "Home" [Salt Tank Reconstruction]
 "Rendezvous" [Quadrophonic Mix]
 "Reflect" [Original Mix]
 "Cafe del Mar" [Three 'N' One Mix]
 "Nightmare" [Original Sinister Strings Mix]
 "You're Not Alone" [Oakenfold/Osborne Remix]
 "Flash" [Club Mix]
 "How Deep Is Your Love" [Original Mix]
 "X-Ray (Follow Me)"
 "The Prophet" [Original Mix]
 "Schöneberg"
 "Prophase" [X-Cabs Remix One]

Disc 2
 "Free"
 "Freestyle Orchestra"
 "Belo Horizonti" [Original Mix]
 "Gunman"
 "Ajare" [Original Mix]
 "Breathe"
 "Nine Ways" [Original Mix]
 "Cowgirl"
 "Your Face (In the Mirror)"
 "Don't Be Afraid" [Brittany Remix]
 "Off Shore" [Disco Citizens Remix]
 "Everytime" [Nalin & Kane Mix]
 "Get Up! Go Insane" [Rock 'N' Roll Mix]
 "Sunchyme"
 "Block Rockin' Beats"

References

Paul Oakenfold remix albums
1997 remix albums